The 1899–1900 Yale Bulldogs men's ice hockey season was the 5th season of play for the program.

Season
For the second consecutive season, Yale was declared Intercollegiate Hockey League champions, finishing undefeated against all conference opponents.

The team did not have a coach, however, E.A. Strong served as team manager.

Yale played their first game against Harvard, the program that would eventually become their most enduring rival.

Roster

Standings

Schedule and Results

|-
!colspan=12 style="color:white; background:#00356B" | Regular Season

References

Yale Bulldogs men's ice hockey seasons
Yale
Yale
Yale
Yale